In type theory and functional programming, a stream is a potentially infinite analog of a list, given by the coinductive definition:

data Stream α = Nil | Cons α (Stream α)

Generating and computing with streams requires lazy evaluation, either implicitly in a lazily evaluated language or by creating and forcing thunks in an eager language. In total languages they must be defined as codata and can be iterated over using (guarded) corecursion.

See also 
 Coinduction

References 

Type theory
Functional programming
Functional data structures